Vingtaine du Coin Hâtain is one of the five vingtaines of St Lawrence Parish on the Channel Island of Jersey.

References

Coin Hatain
Hatain
Jersey articles needing attention